Kelowna Flightcraft Air Charter trading as KF Cargo and Kelowna Flightcraft trading as KF Maintenance and Engineering is a cargo airline based in Kelowna, British Columbia, Canada. It operates long term cargo charters for couriers and freight companies, forest fire patrols, and aircraft sales and leasing in Canada and worldwide. It also provides maintenance and aircraft manufacturing services.

History

KF Cargo is a subsidiary company of KF Aerospace, which was established as Kelowna Flightcraft on March 20, 1970 and the cargo subsidiary was established and started operating in June 1974. It is wholly owned by Barry Lapointe Holding.

Destinations

KF Cargo operates  air cargo services to the following destinations: 

John C. Munro Hamilton International Airport Hub
Kamloops Airport
Kelowna International Airport Hub
Prince George Airport
Vancouver International Airport Hub
Victoria International Airport

Fleet

Current fleet

As of September 2019, KF Cargo/KF Maintenance and Engineering has the following aircraft registered with Transport Canada.

Leasing
KF Cargo leases out Convair 580/5800s. KF Cargo's leasing operations has the distinction of developing the world's first Boeing 737-300QC.

The company has leased aircraft to several Canadian passenger airlines including Harmony Airways, Greyhound Air, Roots Air in the past and also in the United States to IFL Group Inc. Currently, KF Cargo leases its Boeing 737-300QC to Canadian North.

Historical fleet
The airline previously operated a diverse range of aircraft including:

Aero Commander
Beechcraft aircraft
Bell 206
Boeing 727-100F
Boeing 727-200F
Boeing 737-200
Boeing 737-300
Boeing 737-400SF
Boeing 737-800
Boeing 757-200
Cessna aircraft
Convair CV-340
Convair CV-440
Convair CV-580
de Havilland Canada DHC-4 Caribou
Douglas DC-3
McDonnell Douglas DC-10-30F
Fairchild F27
Grumman Gulfstream I
Helio Courier
Howard 500
Israel 1124
Israel 1125
Mitsubishi MU-2
Piper Aircraft
Robinson R44
Taylorcraft DC65.

Accidents and incidents
On January 13, 1999, a Douglas DC-3 (C-GWUG) crashed into Mount Parke, Mayne Island while on a domestic cargo flight from Vancouver International Airport to Victoria International Airport. The aircraft was destroyed and both pilots, the only occupants, were killed. Investigation revealed that the flight was being operated under visual flight rules at night, in contravention of Canadian Aviation Regulations.

On July 9, 1981, a Howard 500 (C-GKFN), operated by Kelowna Flightcraft for overnight freight operations, crashed shortly after takeoff from Toronto International Airport. Fatalities: 3 crew.

On September 7, 1976, a Douglas C-47 (C-GKFC) was destroyed by fire after an emergency landing near Brocket, Alberta. All 26 people on board escaped. The aircraft was on a domestic non-scheduled passenger flight from Vernon Regional Airport, British Columbia to Lethbridge Airport, Alberta.

Bases
Pilot bases include Kelowna International Airport, John C. Munro Hamilton International Airport, and Vancouver International Airport.

Primary maintenance bases include John C. Munro Hamilton International Airport and Kelowna International Airport with a satellite base at Vancouver International Airport.

See also
List of airlines of Canada

References

External links

KF Cargo
KF Maintenance and Engineering
 

Air Transport Association of Canada
Cargo airlines of Canada
Charter airlines of Canada
Airlines established in 1970
Companies based in Kelowna
1970 establishments in British Columbia
Canadian companies established in 1970